Edward Philips, Ben Avram (born 1941) is an artist who was born in Bombay, India and immigrated to Israel as a teenager. He graduated from the Bezalel Academy of Art and Design in 1965 and continues to call Jerusalem his home.

Most of Ben Avram's oil paintings and watercolors portrays Israeli cities, religious festivals, and Bible stories. He paints in creamy sensual tones incorporating symbols such as doves, a menorah, and Shabbat candles.

Exhibitions
1964 Group exhibitions in the United States and Canada
1977 Safrai Gallery, Jerusalem
1981–1986 Artexpo, New York City
1981–1986 Artexpo, Los Angeles
2001–current Blue and White Art Gallery, Jerusalem

Auction record
The auction record for a painting by Ben Avram is $6,875.  This record was set by The Twelve Tribes, a 47.24 by 31.5 inch oil painting on canvas sold 28 December 2010 at Matsa for Public Auctions-Matsa Gallery (Tel Aviv).

References
 Ben Avram, Edward, Passover Haggadah Illustrated by Ben Avram, Keshatot Arts, 1995, .

Footnotes

External links
  Ben Avram official site
 Biography of Ben Avram
 Edward Ben Avram - Art Profile

1941 births
Living people
Indian emigrants to Israel
Israeli people of Indian-Jewish descent
Indian Jews
Indian male painters
Jewish painters
Israeli male painters
Jewish Israeli artists
Artists from Mumbai
20th-century Indian painters
20th-century Israeli painters
20th-century Israeli male artists
Painters from Maharashtra
20th-century Indian male artists